A Diploma in Nursing or Nursing Diploma is an entry-level tertiary education nursing credential.

Background 
In the United States, this diploma is usually awarded by hospital-based nursing schools. Diploma programs in the United States require 2-3 years of training prior to graduation.  Students awarded a Diploma in Nursing are qualified to take the NCLEX-RN exam and apply for licensure as a Registered Nurse.

At one time, all nurses in the United States were diploma-prepared.  The Cherry Ames series of children's books was created to encourage girls to go into the nursing profession during World War II.  She was a "hospital diploma" nurse.

Although the number of hospital-based nursing schools continues to decrease, many still exist.  Some require that non-nursing prerequisite courses be completed at another school prior to admission or coordinate their program with classes at a nearby school, though many are still self-contained. 

Some hospital based nursing programs with colleges to offer cooperative programs that grant students a Diploma in Nursing, and a Bachelors of Science in Nursing (BSN). 

Nurses in other countries may also have diplomas, such as Practical Nurses in Canada, which complete a 2-3 diploma equivalent or greater in length to an associate degree in nursing completed the United States.

In India, this type of diploma is awarded by hospital-based nursing schools as well as by the hospitals based on the 'Experience' of a person in this field.
Also, in India, a Nursing degree/diploma is awarded by the Government Nursing Colleges affiliated to some of the Universities in India preferably Health Universities. In Maharashtra state of India, the Health University is situated at Nashik. All the Medical colleges in Maharashtra state of India are governed by this Health University. The syllabus for all the courses such as MBBS, BAMS, BHMS, BEMS, MD, MS etc.is decided by the Authorities of the University comprising the representatives in the field. Also, the schedule of the college terms, examinations (Theory/Practical/Orals/Submissions by the students/Laboratory records by the students, etc.) is decided by the University Authorities. The academic year of the medical colleges begins some time in October/November of every year. All graduation courses are of four-year duration (i.e. eight semesters). The first three years are of Two semesters whereas the last year is of three semesters. After the completion of the study course, the students have to undergo a year training course called "Internship" in the Government and Private hospitals.

References

See also

 Associate of Science in Nursing
 Bachelor of Science in Nursing
 Master of Science in Nursing
 Doctor of Nursing Practice
 Nurse education

Nursing degrees